Dendarus is a genus of darkling beetles in the family Tenebrionidae. The genus is distributed from Morocco to Caucasus and exhibits a high level of diversity with 36 species, 27 of which are island endemics.
Analyses of the phylogenetic relationships of 23 species from Greece and Turkey revealed 13 distinct lineages with several para- and polyphyletic cases corresponding to three major phylogroups [south/south-east Aegean (D. foraminosus complex, D. rhodius, D. sporadicus, D. wettsteini); central to north Aegean, Turkey and mainland Greece (D. crenulatus, D. moesiacus group, D. sinuatus complex, D. stygius) and mainland Greece (D. messenius, D. paganettii)].

Species 
The following species and subspecies within Dendarus are accepted by the Fauna Europaea database:

 Dendarus ananensis Chatzimanolis, Engel & Trichas, 2002
 Dendarus anaphianus Koch, 1948
 Dendarus angulitibia Koch, 1948
 Dendarus antikythirensis Chatzimanolis, Engel & Trichas, 2002
 Dendarus armeniacus Baudi, 1876
 Dendarus aubei (Mulsant & Rey, 1854)
 Dendarus caelatus Brullé, 1832
 Dendarus calcaratus Baudi, 1881
 Dendarus carinatus (Mulsant & Rey, 1854)
 Dendarus cazorlensis Koch, 1944
Dendarus coarcticollis (Mulsant, 1854)
 Dendarus corcyrensis Koch, 1948
 Dendarus crenulatus (Ménétriés, 1832)
 Dendarus dalmatinus (Germar, 1824)
 Dendarus dentitibia Koch, 1948
 Dendarus depressus Reitter, 1915
 Dendarus dragonadanus Koch, 1948
 Dendarus elongatus (Mulsant & Rey, 1854)
 Dendarus falassarnensis Chatzimanolis, Engel & Trichas, 2002
 Dendarus foraminosus (Kuster, 1851)
 Dendarus graecus Brullé, 1832
 Dendarus grampusanus Koch, 1948
 Dendarus insidiosus (Mulsant & Rey, 1854)
 D. insidiosus subsp. alcojonensis Español, 1961
 D. insidiosus subsp. insidiosus (Mulsant & Rey, 1854)
 Dendarus lugens (Mulsant & Rey, 1854)
 Dendarus maximus Koch, 1948
 Dendarus messenius (Brullé, 1832)
 Dendarus moesiacus (Mulsant & Rey, 1854)
 Dendarus mylonasi Chatzimanolis, Engel & Trichas, 2002
 Dendarus opacus Koch, 1948
 Dendarus orientalis Seidlitz, 1893
 Dendarus pardoi Escalera, 1944
 Dendarus pectoralis (Mulsant & Rey, 1854)
 D. pectoralis subsp. bejarensis Español, 1961
 D. pectoralis subsp. castilianus (Piochard de la Brulerie, 1869) 
 D. pectoralis subsp. pectoralis (Mulsant & Rey, 1854) 
 Dendarus piceus (Olivier, 1811)
 Dendarus piochardi Español, 1937
 Dendarus plicatulus (Brullé, 1832)
 D. plicatulus subsp. jonicus Koch, 1948 
 D. plicatulus subsp. paganettii Koch, 1948 
 D. plicatulus subsp. plicatulus (Brullé, 1832) 
 D. plicatulus subsp. victoris (Mulsant & Rey, 1854) 
 Dendarus politus Reitter, 1904 
 Dendarus punctatus (Serville, 1825) 
 Dendarus puncticollis Koch, 1948 
 Dendarus rhodius Baudi, 1876 
 Dendarus schatzmayri Koch, 1948
 Dendarus schusteri Español, 1937
 Dendarus scoparipes Reitter, 1904 
 Dendarus seidlitzi Reitter, 1904
 Dendarus serripes Reitter, 1904 
 Dendarus simius (Mulsant & Rey, 1854) 
 Dendarus sinuatus (Mulsant & Rey, 1854) 
 Dendarus sporadicus Koch, 1948 
 Dendarus stampalicus Koch, 1948 
 Dendarus stygius (Waltl, 1838) 
 D. stygius subsp. oertzeni Koch, 1948 
 D. stygius subsp. stygius (Waltl, 1838) 
 Dendarus tenellus (Mulsant & Rey, 1854)
 Dendarus tristis Laporte de Castelnau, 1840
 Dendarus werneri Koch, 1948 
 Dendarus wernerianus Koch, 1948 
 Dendarus wettsteini Koch, 1948
 Dendarus zariquieyi Español, 1937
 D. zariquieyi subsp. almeriensis Escalera, 1944
 D. zariquieyi subsp. vivesi Español, 1961
 D. zariquieyi subsp. zariquieyi Español, 1937

Notes

References

External links

 

Tenebrionidae